Francis Gymnasium is a building at Washington University in St. Louis, currently used by the university's athletics department. Built in 1903, it is located in St. Louis County, Missouri, on the far western edge of the university's Danforth Campus. It is part of the Washington University Hilltop Campus Historic District.

Completed in time for 1904's Louisiana Purchase Exposition, the gymnasium was used as the main indoor venue for the 1904 Summer Olympics, hosting the boxing and fencing events.

After the Olympics, the building was turned over to the Washington University Athletics Department. In the early 1920s, a field house and a swimming pool were built next to Francis Gym. In 1985, a major renovation connected Francis Gym and the renovated field house with additional facilities and recreation space, and replaced the pool with the Olympic-sized Millstone Pool.

References 

Venues of the 1904 Summer Olympics
Olympic boxing venues
Olympic fencing venues
Sports venues in St. Louis
Washington University in St. Louis campus
Defunct boxing venues in the United States
Boxing in Missouri
Sports venues in Missouri